Paula DeAnda is the debut album by American pop singer Paula DeAnda. It includes four singles: "Doing Too Much" featuring Baby Bash, "Walk Away (Remember Me)" featuring The DEY, "When It Was Me", and "Easy" featuring Bow Wow. The song "Overloved", written by Diane Warren, was originally recorded by Raven-Symoné for her third album, This Is My Time. The album peaked at #54 on the Billboard 200. This ultimately became the only album DeAnda released through Arista. On July 31, 2007 the album had sold only 215,000 copies in the U.S. and about 409,000 copies worldwide.

The album was re-released in 2007 with 4 new tracks, "Irresistible", "Back Up Off Me", and Spanish Versions of both "Easy" and "Doing Too Much" respectively titled "Fácil", and "Lo Qué Hago Por Tu Amor". "Lo Que Hago Por Tu Amor" was previously an iTunes Bonus Track on the original version of Paula DeAnda and "Back Up Off Me" was a Japanese  bonus track. This version replaced the original version of "Easy" featuring Lil Wayne with the single version featuring Bow Wow.

Critical reception
AllMusic editor found that "with an equal emphasis on sultry R&B ballads and uptempo dance-pop, Paula DeAnda's 2006 self-titled debut can easily be filed next to contemporary R&B divas like Beyoncé and Mariah Carey [...]  Yet DeAnda's voice and lyrics add a bit of bite to the glossy R&B, and that distinctive twist, along with major-label support, make the singer a talent to watch."

Track listing 

Sample credits
"Good Girl" contains a portion of the composition "That's How It Is" written by Eddie Watkins, Jr.
"Make 'em Clap To This" contains a sample from "Eric B. Is President" written by Eric Barrier & William Griffin as performed by Eric B. & Rakim.
"Breathe" contains a sample from "Please Darling, Don't Say Goodbye" written by Gil Askey & Linda Clifford as performed by Linda Clifford
"Let's Go Out Tonight" contains a portion of the composition "Thinking About Your Charm" written by Reginald Andrews, Leon "Ndugu" Chancler and Donnie Sterling.

Charts

References

2006 debut albums
Paula DeAnda albums
Arista Records albums
Albums produced by Danja (record producer)
Albums produced by Happy Perez
Albums produced by Stargate